Siah may refer to:

She (surname), a Chinese family name
Siah (group), an Israeli left-wing group
Siah, Iran, a village in Ardabil Province, Iran
Siah Jamegan F.C., an Iranian football club

People
Siah Albison, British runner
Siah Khan, Iranian record holder
Siah and Yeshua DapoED, American hip hop duo

See also
 Siah Siah (disambiguation)
 Siah Darreh (disambiguation)
 Siah Gel (disambiguation)
 Siah Kalan (disambiguation)
 Siah Kesh (disambiguation)
 Siah Kuh (disambiguation)
 Siah Rud (disambiguation)
 Siah Rudbar (disambiguation)
 
 SIADH (syndrome of inappropriate antidiuretic hormone)